Vesthimmerland Municipality or Vesthimmerlands Municipality is a municipality in the North Jutland Region in Denmark. It covers an area of 768,08 km² (2013) and has a total population of 36,326 (2022). The Municipality borders Jammerbugt Municipality to the south and to the east it borders Rebild and Aalborg Municipality and to the south it borders Viborg Municipality and to the south-east it borders Mariagerfjord Municipality.

On 1 January 2007 Vesthimmerland municipality was created as the result of Kommunalreformen ("The Municipal Reform" of 2007), consisting of the former municipalities of Aalestrup, Farsø, Løgstør, and Aars.

The municipal seat is the city of Aars, which also was the seat in the former Aars Municipality.

Four principal towns
The municipality's four principal towns (hovedbyer) are Aars, Farsø, Løgstør & Aalestrup, all of them were former municipal seats of their former municipalities.

Aars

Aars, the municipal seat of Vesthimmerland municipality and the largest town of Vesthimmerland municipality, is located to the east of  the three other principal towns. Aars is/was a railway town and was the principal town of Aars Municipality. It has a population of 8,246.

Farsø

Farsø is a town with a population of 3,299 in Region Nordjylland in Denmark in the Vesthimmerland municipality. It is located west of Aars, south of Løgstør, and north-west of Aalestrup. Until 1 January 2007 Farsø was also a municipality in North Jutland County. The municipality covered an area of 201 km², and had a total population of 7,991.

Løgstør

Løgstør is a town with a population of 4,284 and the former seat of Løgstør municipality. It is located north-west of the other principal towns. The former municipality, including the island of Livø, covered an area of 218 km2 (84 sq mi), and had a total population of 10,270.

Aalestrup

Aalestrup is a town in Vesthimmerland municipality with a population of 2,729. It is the furthest south of all the four principal towns. Aalestrup School has 294 students. It was also a municipal seat until 2007.

Municipality's largest towns

Mayors of Vesthhimmerland

Former municipalities

Aars Municipality

The municipality covers an area of 223 km², and had a total population of 13,284 (2005).  Its latest mayor was Knud V. Christensen, a member of the Conservative People's Party (Det Konservative Folkeparti) political party.

Farsø Municipality

The municipality covered an area of 201 km², and had a total population of 7,991 (2005). Its last mayor was H. O. A. Kjeldsen, a member of the Venstre (Liberal Party) political party.

Løgstør Municipality

Its last mayor was Jens Lauritzen, a member of the Venstre (Liberal Party) political party.

Aalestrup Municipality

The municipality covered an area of 176 km², and had a total population of 7,631 (2005).  Its latest mayor was Rigmor Sandborg.

The main town and the site of its municipal council was the town of Aalestrup. The municipality was located on the eastern shores of the area known as Himmerland, a part of the Jutland peninsula; the western border of the municipality was partially defined by the waters of Lovn's Broadening (Lovns Bredning).

Politics

Municipal council
Næstved's municipal council consists of 27 members, elected every four years.

Below are the municipal councils elected since the Municipal Reform of 2007.

Notable people
Not including people included on the Wiki pages for their own towns and villages elsewhere in the municipality
 Knud Erik Pedersen, (Danish Wiki) (born 1934 in Skarp Salling near Løgstør) a Danish author.
 Gert Bo Jacobsen (born 1961 in Østrup near Aars) the former WBO welterweight champion of the world 
 Søren T. Lyngsø – engineer and business owner.

Twin towns and sister cities

References

External links 

  
 Municipal statistics: NetBorger Kommunefakta, delivered from KMD  Kommunedata (Municipal Data)
 Municipal mergers and neighbors: Eniro new municipalities map

 
Municipalities of the North Jutland Region
Municipalities of Denmark
Populated places established in 2007